William Battcock (dates of birth and death unknown) was an English cricketer.  The hand with which Battcock batted and his bowling style are also not known.  Although where he was born is not known, it is known he was christened on 1 June 1783 at Ford, Sussex.

Battcock made his first-class debut for G Osbaldeston's XI against Lord F Beauclerk's XI in 1814.  His second and final appearance in first-class cricket came for Sussex in 1817 against Epsom Cricket Club.

References

External links

People from Arun District
English cricketers
Sussex cricketers
English cricketers of 1787 to 1825
1783 births
Year of death unknown
George Osbaldeston's XI cricketers